Rev. William Arthur Johnson (1816–1880) was an amateur biologist, naturalist, microscopist, botanist, and ordained clergyman who lived in Canada.

Biography 
Born in Bombay, India, he was a descendant of the Duke of Wellington, he was called Arthur. Johnson moved in Upper Canada in 1835, first settling in Port Maitland, Ontario, then to Toronto by 1848. He attended the Diocesan Theological Institute in Cobourg, Ontario and became a clergyman. He was a curate to Archdeacon A. N. Bethune at Cobourg. However, his tractarian tendencies made him unpopular and he was made rector of St.Philip's at Etobicoke, a remote village across the river from Weston. There, he established a school in 1865 that was to become Trinity College School in Weston, Ontario, where William Osler became a student. Johnson became the major early influence for Osler at this time, along with his friend James Bovell. A keen collector of both animal and vegetal specimens, Johnson was schoolmaster and rector of St. Philip's Church, Weston. Johnson died in Toronto in 1880. A collection of his microscopic and field sketches are conserved at the Osler Library of the History of Medicine, McGill University.

References

Further reading 
 Keith Dalton, Frederick (1965). A Biography of the Reverend William Arthur Johnson (1816-1880), Clergyman, Artist, Architect, Scientist, Teacher.  F.K. Dalton

External links 
 Dictionary of Canadian Biography

Amateur biologists
Canadian educators
Canadian biologists
Canadian Anglican priests
1816 births
1880 deaths